Basketball was one of the 13 sports in the 1962 Asian Games in Jakarta, Indonesia. The Philippines successfully defended their title and got their fourth straight Asian Games championship. The games were held from 25 August to 3 September 1962.

Medalists

Draw

Group A

Group B

Group C

* Indonesian government refused to issue visas for the Taiwanese delegation.

Results

Preliminary round

Group A

Group B

Group C

Classification 7th–9th

Final round

Final standing

References 
 Results

 
Basketball
1962
1962 in Asian basketball
International basketball competitions hosted by Indonesia